Kunlun Station is the southernmost of four Chinese research stations in Antarctica. When it is occupied during the summer, it is the second-southernmost research base in Antarctica, behind only the American Amundsen–Scott South Pole Station at the geographical South Pole. When Kunlun is not in operation, the year-round Russian Vostok Station is the second-southernmost base in Antarctica.

It is located at 4087 m above sea level on the East Antarctic Ice Sheet, making it the highest base in Antarctica. It is only 7.3 km southwest of Dome A, the loftiest point on the Antarctic Plateau. The station was officially opened on January 27, 2009. Fully constructed the station is planned to cover an area of 558 m². The main building, covering 236 m², is planned erected in April 2009.

The site is one of the coldest in the world, with temperatures occasionally reaching  in the winter. It is indicated from satellite measurements that places nearby could reach a world record  temperature.

In April 2012 the first of three Antarctica Schmidt telescopes (AST3) was installed at Kunlun Station. The other two were planned for installation in 2013 and 2014. A bigger optical telescope, Kunlun Dark Universe Survey Telescope (KDUST), is planned to be installed by 2025.

Telescopes at Kunlun Station

See also

 List of Antarctic research stations
 List of Antarctic field camps
Antarctic Great Wall Station
Antarctic Zhongshan Station
Antarctic Taishan Station
Arctic Yellow River Station
Polar Research Institute of China
Xuě Lóng

References

External links
 Official website Polar Research Institute of China
 Official website Chinese Arctic and Antarctic Administration
 International Polar Foundation report
 PLATO - Dome A Robotic Observatory
 Photos of inauguration
 PLATO - Dome A webcam

Outposts of Antarctica
China and the Antarctic
Polar Research Institute of China
Buildings and structures completed in 2009
2009 establishments in Antarctica